Christina McKelvie (born 4 March 1968) is a Scottish politician who has served as Minister for Equalities and Older People since 2018. A member of the Scottish National Party (SNP), she has been the Member of the Scottish Parliament (MSP) for the Hamilton, Larkhall and Stonehouse since 2011, having previously represented the Central Scotland region from 2007 to 2011.

Early life
McKelvie was born on 4 March 1968 in Glasgow. She grew up in Easterhouse, in the East End of the city, and was educated at St Leonard's Secondary School. McKelvie then went on to gain qualifications from Anniesland College, Cardonald College, and the University of St Andrews. She worked in the social work services department of Glasgow City Council as a learning and development officer. She has been an active trade unionist with Unison.

Political career
In 2007, McKelvie was selected as the SNP candidate for the Hamilton South constituency where she was unsuccessful, however she was elected through the regional list to represent the Central Scotland region. At the 2011 Scottish Parliament election, McKelvie contested the Hamilton, Larkhall and Stonehouse seat and was elected. She served as convener of the European and External Relations Committee from 14 June 2011 until 23 March 2016.

In 2016, she was re-elected to the Hamilton, Larkhall and Stonehouse constituency. Within Parliament she became the Convener of the Equalities and Human Rights Committee.

In February 2021 she announced a short medical leave. Her ministerial role was covered by Shirley-Anne Somerville who would fill in as minister for equalities and older people.

References

External links 
 
 personal website for Christina McKelvie MSP

1968 births
Living people
People educated at St Leonard's Secondary School
Alumni of the University of St Andrews
Scottish National Party MSPs
Members of the Scottish Parliament 2007–2011
Members of the Scottish Parliament 2011–2016
Members of the Scottish Parliament 2016–2021
Members of the Scottish Parliament 2021–2026
Ministers of the Scottish Government
Female members of the Scottish Parliament
Politicians from Glasgow